Demiurge Unit Limited is a LED design company with offices in New York and Hong Kong. Founded by LED artist Teddy Lo in New York, Demiurge Unit expanded its operation into Hong Kong in 2005.

Business and Services
Demiurge Unit focuses on LED illumination technology.  It offers services in (1) LED design & consultancy and (2) art direction, graphic design and contemporary art.  LED design & consultancy includes architectural and façade lighting, interior and events lighting, and LED signage. Art direction includes interactive design, graphic and motion graphics, artistic LED programming, and overall project art direction.

Awards

 Innovative Entrepreneur 2007 by Junior Chamber International – City Junior Chamber
 2006 Hong Kong Awards for Industries – Innovative & Creativity Certificate of Merit by Hong Kong General Chamber of Commerce
 China Solid State Lighting Design Award by China Solid State Lighting Association

Memberships

 Ambassadors of Design (Hong Kong)
 Hong Kong Design Centre
 Hong Kong Design Association
 Hong Kong General Chamber of Commerce
 Junior Chamber International
 Innovator Entrepreneur
 CIE (Commission Internationale de l’Eclairage) Hong Kong

Projects
LED Design : Innocentre, MIST, AIDS Concern, VIA-Stella, Innovative & Design Expo, Business of Design Week, Miramar Shopping Mall, Russell Simon’s Art for Life, KEF, Philips LED Graphics, Good Luck Beijing

Art Direction : DTFU, Magic Mirror, One Red Dot, Untitled, BODW, Common Space Branding, Common Space x Samsung Branding, Equestrian, KEF Event Graphics, Philips LED Graphics, Pi Branding, INNO MIST Animation, Singapore Exhibition, VIA

External links
 Company website

Design companies of the United States
Design companies of China